Scully Grove Quarry is a  geological Site of Special Scientific Interest in Gloucestershire, England, notified in 1974.

The site is listed in the Forest of Dean Local Plan Review as a Key Wildlife Site (KWS).

Location and geology
The quarry is in the north of the Forest of Dean near Mitcheldean, and is important for its unique features.  The basal rock exposed is Crease Limestone which has been altered to dolomite. It represents a shallow water high energy deposit on a carbonate tamp. There is Whitehead Limestone (Chadian/Arundian) of up to  depth above the Crease Limestone. This shows a peritidal phase of deposition, and includes algal laminates, oncoid beds, thin soils and other features of a significant quality for research purposes. Above this is a small amount of fluvial deposits of the Drybrook Sandstone.

Conservation
Natural England reported in March 2009 that scrub control was necessary to protect this site of geological interest.

References

SSSI Source
 Natural England SSSI information on the citation
 Natural England SSSI information on the Scully Grove Quarry unit

External links
 Natural England (SSSI information)

Sites of Special Scientific Interest in Gloucestershire
Sites of Special Scientific Interest notified in 1974
Quarries in Gloucestershire
Mitcheldean